The Greater Richmond Region, the Richmond metropolitan area or Central Virginia, is a region and metropolitan area in the U.S. state of Virginia, centered on Richmond. The U.S. Office of Management and Budget (OMB) defines the area as the Richmond, VA Metropolitan Statistical Area, a Metropolitan Statistical Area (MSA) used by the U.S. Census Bureau and other entities. The OMB defines the area as comprising 17 county-level jurisdictions, including the independent cities of Richmond, Petersburg, Hopewell, and Colonial Heights. As of 2016, it had a population of 1,263,617, making it the 45th largest MSA in the country.

The Greater Richmond Region is located in the central part of Virginia. It straddles the Fall Line, where the coastal plain and the Piedmont come together on the James River at Richmond and the Appomattox River at Petersburg. The English established each as colonial ports in the 17th century. The Greater Richmond Metro region is considered to be the southern extension of the Northeast megalopolis.

Political subdivisions and communities

Independent cities

Since a state constitutional change in 1871, all incorporated cities in Virginia are independent cities and they are not legally located in any county. The OMB considers these independent cities to be county-equivalents for the purpose of defining MSAs in Virginia. Each MSA is listed by its counties, then cities, each in alphabetical order, and not by size.

The area includes four independent cities (listed in order of population):
Richmond
Petersburg
Hopewell
Colonial Heights

The three smaller cities (Petersburg, Hopewell, and Colonial Heights) are located near each other in an area south of Richmond and are known collectively as the "Tri-cities".

Counties
The following counties are included in the Richmond MSA:

 Amelia County
 Charles City County
 Chesterfield County
 Dinwiddie County
 Goochland County
 Hanover County
 Henrico County
 King William County
 New Kent County
 Powhatan County
 Prince George County
 Sussex County

Incorporated towns
Town of Ashland (located in Hanover County)
Town of West Point (located in King William County)
Town of McKenney (located in Dinwiddie County)

Selected unincorporated towns and communities 

The Richmond-Petersburg metropolitan area includes many unincorporated towns and communities.

Note: This is only a partial listing.

Amelia Court House
Atlee
Bon Air
Centralia
Chester
Chesterfield
Disputanta
Enon
Ettrick
Fair Oaks
Fort Lee, Virginia
Glen Allen
Highland Springs
Lakeside
Laurel
Matoaca
Mechanicsville
Midlothian
Montrose
Moseley
New Bohemia
Prince George
Sandston
Short Pump
Soloman's Store
Tuckahoe
Varina
Winterpock

Population

The Richmond Metropolitan Statistical Area (MSA) which includes 3 other cities (Petersburg, Hopewell and Colonial Heights), and adjacent counties is home to approximately 1.3 million Virginians or 15.1% of Virginia's population. The Richmond region is growing at a steady rate, adding nearly 400,000 residents in the past two decades. This has resulted in major suburban sprawl, particularly in Henrico and Chesterfield Counties, both of which have populations over 300,000. This also resulted in boosts in its economy, the building of malls, more national attention, and major sporting events and concerts coming to Richmond. Its arts and culture scene has also seen a major gain, with the building or renovations of many new arenas, including the Landmark Theater, Carpenter Center, CenterStage, and the creation of an art walk, the First Fridays Art Walk, occurring on the first Friday of every month on Broad Street in Downtown Richmond, drawing crowds of over 20,000 people. The population has seen its ups and downs, with the city of Richmond itself dropping a bit below 200,000, but coming back in 2008 to 204,000 people again.

The region is located approximately equidistant from Northern Virginia, Hampton Roads, and Lynchburg. The area is home to the state's center of gravity of population—which, in 1980, was located thirty miles west of Richmond near the Powhatan-Goochland County border.

The Median age for the MSA was 36.7 years.  For people reporting one race alone, 66 percent were White; 30 percent were Black or African American; less than 0.5 percent were American Indian and Alaskan Native; 2.75 percent were Asian; less than 0.5 percent were Native Hawaiian and Other Pacific Islander, and 1 percent were some other race. One percent reported two or more races. Three percent of the people in the Richmond/Petersburg MSA were Hispanic. Sixty-three percent of the people in the Richmond/Petersburg MSA were White non-Hispanic. People of Hispanic origin may be of any race. The median house income for the MSA was $59,468. The median family income was $65,289. The Per Capita income was $27,887.  In 2004, seven percent of people were in poverty. Poverty status is determined by the U.S. Census Bureau and is based on family composition, size, and income level. In the Richmond/Petersburg MSA nine percent of children under age 18 were below the poverty line, and eight
percent of people 65 years old and over were below the poverty line. Five percent of all
families and 15 percent of families with a female householder and no husband present had incomes below the poverty level. The unemployment rate was 4.6%.

In 2004, there were 397,000 households in the Richmond/Petersburg MSA. The average household size was 2.6 people. 
 
In 2004, 85 percent of people 25 years and over had at least graduated from high school and 33 percent had a bachelor's degree or higher. Among people 16 to 19 years old, nine percent were not in school; they were not enrolled in school and had not graduated from high school.

Transportation

Expressways and Interstate highways
Several of the most heavily traveled highways in the state transverse the area, which includes the junctions of Interstate 64 (which runs east-west), and Interstate Highways 85 and 95 (which run north-south). The area is also served by a comprehensive network of Interstate bypasses and  spurs, and several non-interstate expressways. Several of these local roads are funded by tolls, although tolls have long been removed from the area's first limited access highway, the Richmond-Petersburg Turnpike, which opened in 1958, and now forms a portion of I-95 and I-85. I-295 opened in 1992, was the last segment of Virginia's interstate system and forms an eastern bypass of Richmond and Petersburg.

Railway network

The Richmond-Petersburg region is also located along several major rail lines operated by CSX Transportation, Norfolk Southern Railway and the Buckingham Branch Railroad.

The area has four passenger stations served by Amtrak.
 Main Street Station (station code RVM), located in downtown Richmond
 Staples Mill Road Station (station code RVR), located in Henrico County
 Petersburg Station (station code PTB), located in Ettrick
 Ashland Station (station code ASD), located in downtown Ashland, VA
 
The Department of Rail and Public Transportation of the State of Virginia has studies underway for extending high speed passenger rail service to the Virginia Peninsula and South Hampton Roads areas with a rail connection at Richmond to service along both the Northeast Corridor and the Southeast High Speed Rail Corridor. .

Another project, known as Transdominion Express, would extend from Richmond west to Lynchburg and from Washington, DC (Alexandria) south via an existing Virginia Railway Express route to Manassas, extending on south to Charlottesville, Lynchburg, Roanoke and Bristol on the Tennessee border.

Sea and airport facilities
An international deepwater terminal is located at the Port of Richmond  on the James River which is navigable for shipping to Hampton Roads, the Chesapeake Bay, and the Atlantic Ocean.

Richmond International Airport is located in Henrico County, five miles east of the city center. The airport serves domestic destinations, primarily in the Midwest, South, and Northeast, and as recently as the 2010s served international destinations including Canada, Mexico and the Bahamas.

Politics 
The Virginia State Capitol is located in the historic Capitol Square. Also, the new U.S. Courthouse was opened in 2010, and the United States Court of Appeals for the Fourth Circuit is located in Richmond, as well, along with the Federal Reserve Bank of Richmond.

Richmond itself and Petersburg are strongly Democratic, The suburbs began trending Republican at the national level as early as the 1950s; Henrico County, for instance, went Republican in every election from 1952 to 2004.  However, conservative Byrd Democrats continued to hold most suburban local offices and state legislative seats well into the 1980s.  In 2008, Barack Obama became the first Democrat to carry the metropolitan area in decades. Since then, it has remained Democratic at the presidential level and along with northern Virginia, has kept the state of Virginia in the Democratic column.

Economy

The applicable Metropolitan Statistical Area for the Richmond-Petersburg region is the Richmond, VA MSA, which as of 2006 is identical to the region defined in this article. The Richmond MSA provides employment for a total of approximately 472,000 workers. In order of the number of workers, the major employment categories of the region are services; retail trade; manufacturing; state government; finance, insurance and real estate; local government; construction; wholesale trade; transportation and public utilities and federal government. Within the manufacturing category of some 63,700 employees, the largest category of workers is in the tobacco industry. Other important manufacturing categories are chemicals, printing and publishing, paper, and wood manufactures.

This economic diversity, which is typical of the entire Richmond-Petersburg  region, helps to insulate it from hardship due to economic fluctuation in particular sectors of the economy. The region's central location also allows it to benefit from growth in other regions of Virginia and the state as a whole.

Economic and community development
The Greater Richmond area is served by several economic and community development entities, both public and private. Government-linked entities such as the Greater Richmond Partnership bring together elected leadership of local government with leaders from business and industry to coordinate initiatives to foster economic prosperity. In the non-profit sector, The Community Foundation for a greater Richmond, one of the largest Community Foundations in the country, supports a wide range of projects with both competitive results-based grants and donor-directed philanthropy as well as more than 60 academic scholarship programs.

See also
List of U.S. Metropolitan Statistical Areas (MSA) in Virginia

References

 
Geography of Richmond, Virginia
Northeast megalopolis